The Kuchma Government was created after the Ukrainian parliament had ousted the previous Cabinet of Vitold Fokin on October 1, 1992; it contained some of the ministers of its predecessor. 

On December 13, 1992, 316 deputies voted for the appointment of Leonid Kuchma, general director of the Yuzhmash, as Prime Minister of Ukraine. His new government was Ukraine's second since Ukraine gained its independence in August 1991. Note that not all members of the Cabinet were ministers.

On September 21, 1993, the Cabinet was dismissed due to the vote of no confidence resolution adopted by the Verkhovna Rada.

Fokin's ministers (officials)

Composition

References

External links
 Composition of the Kuchma's Government (27 October 1992). Verkhovna Rada website.

Government
Ukrainian governments
1992 establishments in Ukraine
1993 disestablishments in Ukraine
Cabinets established in 1992
Cabinets disestablished in 1993